Bath Simple is a California-based disruptive technology remodeling company that provides all-in-one bathroom design and remodeling services. The company streamlines the process by offering online and in-home design assistance as well as providing single shipment delivery of all products that may be needed for a bathroom remodeling. Often referred to as bathroom in a box, they also arrange for the installation of all products through their network of Bath Simple Certified Contractors and offer a zero waste recycling program.

History

Based in Richmond, California, Bath Simple was launched by John Crowley and Bill Hunscher in 2010. The idea came from the difficulty that both faced in remodeling their bathrooms, as they had to deal with numerous suppliers and contractors to complete their projects. There was no predictability in either the price of the bathroom remodel, or the time required to complete the job. The company was founded to streamline the process for bathroom remodeling by allowing consumers to have a single place to coordinate all of their project details from design through installation. Both saw a problem not with the products, but the process used to select the products and deliver them to consumers. The concept behind Bath Simple was to leverage a “curated” line of high-quality bathroom products combined with a high touch design experience to make the process easier for consumers to design their bathrooms, order/receive their products, and have the installation delivered from a single source.

In 2011, Bath Simple expanded into the San Francisco, Portland, Seattle, Boston, and New York markets. The financing for the expansion came from Blueshift Partners, LLC, and additional angel investors and industry partners.

Process

The Bath Simple process starts online at their website where a customer can learn about the company and peruse the product catalogue and design ideas. Once a customer is ready to begin the design process, they answer a few questions about style and budget, whereupon the company arranges a free in-home consultation with a Bath Simple Certified Designer. Once the design is finalized, Bath Simple has all of the materials sent to their warehouse and then packaged in a box. The box is then sent to the customer as opposed to the customer receiving numerous boxes from numerous different manufacturers.

Bath Simple pairs each customer with a local Bath Simple Certified Contractor for installation of their projects. Upon completion of a project, Bath Simple allows customers to place all of the old items from their bathroom in the box and ship it back to them to be recycled and/or disposed of responsibly.

See also

 Disruptive innovation
 Renovation

References

External links
 Bath Simple on MSNBC
 Bathroom Renovations and Bathroom Remodels Sydney

Companies based in Richmond, California
American companies established in 2010
2010 establishments in California